A ministry of sports or ministry of youth and sports is a kind of government ministry found in certain countries with responsibility for the regulation of sports, particularly those participated in by young people. It is lead by the minister of sport (or sports minister).

The United States is one of the only countries in the world to have no ministry (department) of sports and provide no government funding for its National Olympic Committee.

List of ministries by country
 Ministry of Tourism and Sports (Argentina)
 Minister for Sport (Australia)
 Ministry of Youth and Sports (Azerbaijan)
 Ministry of Youth and Sports (Bangladesh)
 Ministry of Sports (Belarus)
 Sports and Youth Ministry (Belgium)
 Ministry of Sports (Brazil)
 Ministry of Culture, Youth and Sports (Brunei)
 Ministry of Tourism, Culture and Sports (Burkina Faso)
 Minister of Sport and Persons with Disabilities, Canada
 Minister of Culture, Heritage, Tourism and Sport (Manitoba)
 State General Administration of Sports (China)
 Coldeportes - Reorganized as the National Ministry of Sports in 2020 (Colombia)
 Minister of Youth Affairs and Sports (France)
 Ministry of Sport and Youth Affairs (Georgia)
 Ministry of Youth and Sports (Ghana)
 Ministry of Education and Sports (Hungary)
 Ministry of Youth Affairs and Sports (India)
 Minister of Youth and Sports Affairs (Indonesia)
 Minister for Tourism, Culture, Arts, Gaeltacht, Sport and Media, Ireland  
 Ministry of Youth Affairs and Sports (Iceland)
 Ministry of Youth Affairs and Sports (Iran)
 Minister for Tourism, Culture, Arts, Gaeltacht, Sport and Media (Ireland)
 Culture and Sport Minister of Israel
 Youth and Sports Ministry (Kenya)
 Ministry of Ethnic Affairs and Sports (North Korea)
 Ministry of Culture, Sports and Tourism (South Korea)
 Ministry of Ethics and Sports (North Macedonia)
 Ministry of Youth and Sports (Malawi)
 Minister of Youth and Sports (Malaysia)
 Ministry of Youth and Sports (Moldova)
 Ministry of Health and Sports (Myanmar)
 Minister for Sport and Recreation, New Zealand
 Minister of Culture, Sports and Youth (Oman)
 Ministry of Sport (Portugal)
 Ministry of Culture and Sports (Qatar) 
 Ministry of Sport (Russia)
 Ministry of Sports and Human Resources (Rwanda)
 Ministry of Youth and Sports (Serbia)
 Ministry of Culture, Community and Youth, Singapore 
 Ministry of Youth and Sports (Somalia)
 Ministry of Youth and Sports (Somaliland)
 Ministry of Sports and Youth (South Korea)
 Ministry of Telecommunication, Foreign Employment and Sports (Sri Lanka)
 Ministry of Culture and Sports (Tajikistan)
 Ministry of Social Affairs and Sports (Tanzania)
 Ministry of Tourism and Sports (Thailand)
 Ministry of Youth and Sports (Turkey)
 Ministry of Youth and Sports Affairs (Indonesia)
 Minister for Sport and Tourism, United Kingdom
Department for Culture, Media and Sport
 Cabinet Secretary for Health, Wellbeing and Sport, Scotland
 Ministry of Culture, Sports and Tourism (Vietnam)
 Ministry of Youth, Sport, Arts and Recreation (Zimbabwe)

See also
 Ministry of Culture and Sport (disambiguation)

References

 
 
Sports
Sports